Bruise Brothers may refer to:

 Bruise Brothers (San Antonio Spurs), a group of six big men who played for the San Antonio Spurs in the early 1980s
 Bruise Brothers (San Diego Chargers), a group of American football defensive lineman that played in the 1970s and 1980s
 The Bruise Brothers (professional wrestling), American professional wrestling tag team with Porkchop Cash and Dream Machine from the early 1980s
 The Bruise Brothers or The Harris Brothers, American professional wrestlers in the late 1980s
 Bruise Brothers, a strip from the British comic Buster